Kevin Wilkin (born 1 October 1967) is an English manager and former professional footballer. He is the manager of AFC Telford United.

Playing career
Born in Cambridge but raised in the Cambridgeshire village of Milton, Wilkin started his career with hometown side Cambridge City, before moving into the Football League and turning professional with Northampton Town. Later spells followed with Rushden and Diamonds, Nuneaton Borough, Cambridge City and Grantham Town, before returning to Nuneaton as player/assistant manager to Roger Ashby in 2004.

Managerial career

Nuneaton Borough
Following the sacking of Ashby in 2006, he was appointed caretaker manager and was subsequently given the job on a permanent basis. After Nuneaton Borough were liquidated at the end of the 2007–08 season he was appointed manager of the reformed club,. He guided the team to a second-place finish in the Southern League Division One Midlands and promotion at the first attempt, beating Chasetown in the play-off final. The next season, he guided the team to a second successive promotion, beating Chippenham Town in the play-off final after finishing second in the Southern League Premier Division. In 2012, Nuneaton Borough finished the season in fifth place in the Conference North and won the play-off final, after beating Gainsborough Trinity 1–0, guiding them back to the Conference Premier after a nine-year absence.

Wrexham
Wilkin was appointed manager of Nuneaton's Conference Premier rivals Wrexham on a two-year contract on 20 March 2014. Wilkin's first game in charge was against Salisbury City, where his new side drew 1–1. He made changes to the squad early, by re-signing former youngster Bradley Reid on loan, whilst releasing Brett Ormerod. He saw out the season finishing in a club record low place of 17th.

Over the summer of 2014 he completely re-shaped the club, releasing Robert Ogleby, Kyle Parle, David Artell, Jay Colback and Joe Anyinsah, Kevin Thornton and Stephen Wright and Leon Clowes. Although Wilkin made attempts to negotiate renewing contracts, Johnny Hunt and Joslain Mayebi left the club. His recruitment was successful over the summer, with Blaine Hudson the first arrival from Cambridge United. More followed as Wes York and Louis Moult followed from former club Nuneaton. Others included Manny Smith, Connor Jennings and Dan Bachmann on loan from Stoke City. The season began with a win over Dartford, with Wes York bagging a brace. But the first home game of the season saw Wrexham lose 3–0 to Gateshead.

League form dipped over the season, but an FA Cup run saw Wrexham reach the 3rd round, where they faced Stoke City. Mark Carrington gave Wrexham the lead against the Premier League side, but they went on to lose 3–1. Wilkin used the loan system, bringing in the likes of Scott Tancock (Swansea City), Joe Thompson (Bury), Jon Flatt (Wolves), Dan Holman (Colchester United), Sam Finley (TNS), Johnny Hunt (Cambridge United), James Pearson (Leicester City) and Kieron Morris (Walsall). Wilkin's successes in the cups continued in the FA Trophy, as he reached the Semi-Final against Torquay United. Wrexham beat them in both the home and away tie to progress to Wembley Stadium.

Although doing well in the Trophy, Wrexham's form dipped, winning just twice in the seven games between the semi and the final. At Wembley Wrexham faced North Ferriby United, a part-time side from the Conference North. Wrexham lead 2–0 through Louis Moult and Jay Harris. But United came back to level at 2–2, before extra-time and penalties saw the FA Trophy go North Ferriby's way. This would be Wilkin's last game, as he was sacked by the board less than 24 hours later.

Brackley Town
On 21 September 2015, Wilkin was appointed manager of National League North club Brackley Town. On 20 May 2018, Brackley defeated National League club Bromley in the 2018 FA Trophy Final to lift the trophy for the first time in the club's history.

On 29 September 2022, Wilkin was sacked as manager with the club sitting in eighth position in the league.

AFC Telford United

On 10 October 2022, Wilkin was appointed manager at AFC Telford United.

Honours
Wrexham
FA Trophy runner-up: 2014–15

Brackley Town
FA Trophy: 2017–18

References

External links

1967 births
Living people
Sportspeople from Cambridge
English footballers
Association football forwards
Cambridge City F.C. players
Northampton Town F.C. players
Rushden & Diamonds F.C. players
Nuneaton Borough F.C. players
Grantham Town F.C. players
English Football League players
English football managers
Nuneaton Borough F.C. managers
Wrexham A.F.C. managers
Brackley Town F.C. managers
National League (English football) managers
AFC Telford United managers